Project Second Storey, also known as Project Second Story, Project Flying Saucers and also Project Theta, was a committee set up on April 22, 1952 in Canada, to deal with material concerning Flying Saucers.

In 1952, in connection with the establishment of Project Magnet by Wilbert Smith at the Department of Transport, the committee was formed by members of other government agencies and dedicated solely to dealing with "flying saucer" reports. This committee was sponsored by the Defence Research Board. Its main purpose was to collect, catalogue and correlate data from UFO sighting reports.

References 

Ufology
Government responses to UFOs